Eacles cuscoensis is a moth in the family Saturniidae. It is found in Peru.

References

Ceratocampinae
Moths described in 2009